Two total lunar eclipses occurred in 1993: 

 4 June 1993 lunar eclipse
 29 November 1993 lunar eclipse

See also 
 List of 20th-century lunar eclipses
 Lists of lunar eclipses